An inkhorn term is a loanword, or a word coined from existing roots, which is deemed to be unnecessary or over-pretentious.

Etymology 
An inkhorn is an inkwell made of horn. It was an important item for many scholars, which soon became symbolic of writers in general. Later, it became a byword for fussy or pedantic writers. The phrase "inkhorn term" is found as early as 1553.

Adoption 
Controversy over inkhorn terms was rife from the mid-16th to the mid-17th century, during the transition from Middle English to Modern English, when English competed with Latin as the main language of science and learning in England, having just displaced French. Many words, often self-consciously borrowed from classical literature, were deemed useless by critics who argued that the understanding of these redundant borrowings depends on knowledge of classical languages. Some borrowings filled a technical or scientific semantic gap, but others coexisted with Germanic words, often overtaking them.

Writers such as Thomas Elyot and George Pettie were enthusiastic borrowers whereas Thomas Wilson and John Cheke opposed borrowing. Cheke wrote:

Many of these so-called inkhorn terms, such as dismiss, celebrate, encyclopedia, commit, capacity and ingenious, stayed in the language. Many other neologisms faded soon after they were first used; for example, expede is now obsolete, although the synonym expedite and the similar word impede survive. Faced with the influx of loanwords, writers as well known as Charles Dickens tried to either resurrect English words, e.g. gleeman for musician (see glee), sicker for certainly, inwit for conscience, yblent for confused; or coin brand-new words from English's Germanic roots (endsay for conclusion, yeartide for anniversary, foresayer for prophet).

Legacy 

Few of these words coined in opposition to inkhorn terms remained in common usage, and the writers who disdained the use of Latinate words often could not avoid using other loanwords. Although the inkhorn controversy was over by the end of the 17th century, many writers sought to return to what they saw as the purer roots of the language. William Barnes coined words, such as starlore for astronomy and speechcraft for grammar, but they were not widely accepted.

George Orwell famously analysed and criticised the socio-political effects of the use of such words:

See also 

 Aureation
 Calque
 Classical compound
 Franglais
 Plain language
 Prestige (sociolinguistics)
 Uncleftish Beholding

References

Further reading 

 Original texts from the inkhorn debate

Word coinage
Linguistic purism
History of the English language
Historical linguistics